Route 390 is a  long mostly east–west secondary highway in the northwest portion of New Brunswick, Canada.

The route's North-Eastern terminus starts at a sharp turn at route 105 in Tobique Narrows. The road travels south-east following the North bank of the Tobique River passing through the communities of Rowena and Gladwyn.  The road continues north-east continuing to follow the Tobique River to the communities of Red Rapids, then Arthurette before crossing the river then following the south bank of the river.  The road continues North-East to the communities of Odell River, Beveridge, passing Ox Island and finally Wapske, before ending in Arbuckle at Route 108 just outside Plaster Rock.

History

Intersecting routes
None

See also

References

390
390